Marlena Shaw Live at Montreux (also released as Marlena Shaw Live: Cookin' with Blue Note at Montreux) is a live album by American vocalist Marlena Shaw recorded at the Montreux Jazz Festival in 1973 and released on the Blue Note label. Shaw's introduction to the track "Woman of the Ghetto" was sampled for St. Germain's album Tourist (2000), Blue Boy's "Remember Me" (1996), Ghostface Killah's song "Ghetto" (2010), and Spanish hip hop group Violadores del Verso in their song "Balantains".

Reception 
The Allmusic review by Scott Yanow awarded the album 2 stars and stated "it features the R&Bish singer Marlena Shaw in a more spontaneous setting than usual with a trio led by pianist George Gaffney at the 1973 Montreux Jazz Festival. It is not too surprising that Shaw found her greatest successes in pop/soul music for the stylized way that she bends nearly every note and overplays the lyrics (not much subtlety here) fits that idiom quite well".

Track listing 
 "Show Has Begun" (Horace Silver) - 4:48
 "The Song Is You" (Oscar Hammerstein II, Jerome Kern) - 2:20
 "You Are the Sunshine of My Life" (Stevie Wonder) - 4:26
 "Twisted" (Wardell Gray, Annie Ross) - 3:48
 "But for Now" (Bob Dorough) - 4:23
 "Save the Children" (Renaldo Benson, Al Cleveland, Marvin Gaye) - 4:24
 "Woman of the Ghetto" (Richard Evans, Bobby Miller, Marlena Shaw) - 9:59
Recorded at the Montreux Jazz Festival in Montreux, Switzerland on July 5, 1973.

Personnel 
 Marlena Shaw - vocals
 George Gaffney - piano, electric piano
 Ed Boyer - bass
 Harold Jones - drums

References 

Blue Note Records live albums
Marlena Shaw albums
1974 live albums
Albums produced by George Butler (record producer)
Albums recorded at the Montreux Jazz Festival